There is a small community of Indians in Finland consisting mainly of Finnish citizens of Indian origin or descent as well as expatriates from India.

Overview
At the beginning of the 21st century there were about 450 Indians in the Helsinki region. In 2019, Finland was home to over 13500 Indians. The majority of the Indians live in and around the capital Helsinki. Most of them are engaged in businesses such as restaurants and stores selling garments, textiles, artificial jewellery, groceries and gift items. A number of young Indians, mainly computer and telecom experts, have in recent years joined Finnish high-tech companies such as Nokia.

There are hundreds of Indian engineers working in Finland. Many of them came to work there to get a quality life and also their salary would be double than what they would get in India even though taxes erode the difference. At Nokia's research facility alone there are nearly 100 Indians working there. Wipro employed some 300 people in Finland while their competitor Tata Consultancy Services employed 600 individuals. Many of the engineers came with their spouses and children and have settled permanently in Finland.

There is also a sizable population of Indian postgraduate students, both Master’s and PhD level students, in Finland and especially in Helsinki region. They are most prominent in technology related fields.

There are also Indian communities who celebrate indian festivals such as diwali,pongal etc. The sizes of the communities are growing.

Distribution

Notable people

 Jenni Banerjee - Finnish actress
 Anya Lahiri - British actress, model and singer
 Jasmin Mäntylä - Finnish model and singer
 Sanal Edamaruku - a Malayali Indian Rationalist from Kerala
Raghunath Koduvayur - Board Member of Finland India Business Association and Head of Marketing and Communications, IQM Quantum Computers
 Heramb Kulkarni- A social entrepreneur and Educator from www.ccefinland.org

See also 
 Finland–India relations
 Finnish Kale
 Hinduism in Finland

References

Ethnic groups in Finland
Finland